Greg Rusedski defeated the defending champion Pete Sampras in the final, 6–4, 7–6(7–4), 6–3 to win the singles tennis title at the 1998 Paris Open.

Seeds 
A champion seed is indicated in bold text while text in italics indicates the round in which that seed was eliminated.  All sixteen seeds received a bye into the second round.

  Pete Sampras (final)
  Marcelo Ríos (quarterfinals)
  Patrick Rafter (third round)
  Carlos Moyà (second round)
  Andre Agassi (quarterfinals)
  Álex Corretja (second round)
  Karol Kučera (third round)
  Yevgeny Kafelnikov (semifinals)
  Tim Henman (third round)
  Petr Korda (second round)
  Richard Krajicek (second round)
  Jonas Björkman (second round)
  Greg Rusedski (champion)
  Goran Ivanišević (second round)
  Jan Siemerink (second round)
  Álbert Costa (second round)

Draw

Finals

Top half

Section 1

Section 2

Bottom half

Section 3

Section 4

External links
 1998 Paris Open draw

Singles